The National Research Centre on Equines (NRCE) was established during 7th five-year plan under the aegis of Indian Council of Agricultural Research for research on equine health and production considering the importance of equines in India.

History: Main campus at Hisar 

After the initial joining of the Project Director at ICAR headquarters on 26 November 1985, the Centre became operational at Hisar on 7 January 1986 for conducting researches and for providing effective health coverage for equines.

NRCE

Objective 

 To undertake research on health and production management in equines.
 To develop diagnostic/biologicals for major equine diseases and to act as national referral facilities for diagnosis, surveillance and monitoring of equine diseases and to provide diagnostic, advisory and consultancy service.

Campuses

Hisar campus 

Hisar is main campus.

Bikaner campus 

The National Research Centre on equines, Bikaner Campus was established on September 28, 1989 for conducting research for improving the technologies for optimization of production potential of the equines. The campus has state-of-art laboratories for conducting research in equine genetics, nutrition, medicine, reproduction and management. The Centre has the responsibility on generation of technologies for augmenting equine performance in order to uplift the socio-economic status of poor equine owners. Conservation and propagation of equines through ecotourism has recently been initiated. The elite Marwari of Rajasthan,  Kathiawari horses of Gujarat,  Zanskari horses  of Ladakh and Manipuri horses of Manipur and Poitou donkeys of France are bred here. An Equine Information Centre and a Museum has been developed for the depicting the basic technical details about the horses. Cryopreservation of semen, artificial insemination, ultrasonography and endoscopy of equines is routinely carried out here.

See also 

 List of Universities and Colleges in Hisar
 List of institutions of higher education in Haryana
 List of think tanks in India

External links
 NRCE website

Research institutes in Hisar (city)
Indian Council of Agricultural Research
Universities and colleges in Hisar (city)
Mammals of India
Equine welfare
Veterinary research institutes
Horses in India
1986 establishments in Haryana
Research institutes established in 1986
Veterinary medicine in India